WBZB (1130 AM) is a daytime only radio station  broadcasting a top 40/CHR format, licensed to Murray, Kentucky.  The station is currently owned by Forever Communications, Inc. and features programming from ESPN Radio.

In addition to games and commentary of national interest, WBZB featured the area's only local sports show hosted by prominent local athlete and play-by-play man for the Murray High Tigers, Travis Turner.

Local sports updates were given daily from Neal Bradley, and are given as "Brought to you by Froggyland Sports".

Local programs
1130 WBZB The Office boasted the only live and local sports talk show in Western Kentucky.  The Travis Turner Sports Show offered interviews and insight of local high school sports, along with national guests.

The Travis Turner Sports Show had guests from not only Murray and Calloway County (the main coverage area), but from other parts of the region, because it is the only outlet on a daily basis.  This is also assisted by the streaming of his show online at Froggyland Sports.

Froggyland Sports
Travis Turner is the creator and force behind Froggyland Sports.  The site is named for the sister station WFGS-FM and their coverage area.  "FLS", which is what the site is called for short, gives you updates on local "Froggyland" high schools, and streams online the Travis Turner Sports Show.

Along with streaming the Travis Turner Sports Show, "FLS" also broadcasts the Murray High School athletics.  This gives extended families the opportunity to listen to how well their young relatives are playing.

Previous National sports programs
Mike and Mike Sign On – 9:00am
Colin Cowherd (Fox Sports Radio) 9:00am – 1:00pm
Russillo and Kanell 1:00pm – 3:00pm
Doug Gottlieb (CBS Sports Radio) 3:00pm – 3:30pm
ESPN Radio 5:00pm – Sign Off
Nationally broadcast NCAA football and basketball games are aired over the weekends, while the Westwood One NFL game of the week is aired on Sundays during football season.

Television simulcasts
Something unique for The Office is that at most points throughout the day, the previous sports programming that was airing can also be seen on television.  Nationally this is done with the ESPN channels, but locally in Murray, Kentucky it is due in part to local cable provide Murray Electric System.

Mike and Mike – ESPN2
Colin Cowherd – FS1
Russillo and Kanell – ESPNews
Travis Turner Sports Show – Murray Electric System Channel 15

Station events
1130 ESPN The Office (along with sister stations WNBS-AM and WFGS-FM) held different events through the year.

Annual Home, Lawn & Farm Show – This event dates back over 20 years (the first being held in 1989).  It has always been the expo for vendors to show off their wares.  There are always vendors that cater to different parts of the show, whether they represent HOME, LAWN or FARM.  Often there are also "sub category" areas, like; Children's Play Area, Women's World or the Men's Sit a Spell.  This event always occurs within the first quarter of the year.  The Annual Home, Lawn & Farm show calls the Regional Special Events Center (RSEC) home currently, thus scheduling is subject to Murray State University basketball games and/or other events that are brought in.

History
The station went on the air September 12, 1978, as WSJP, owned by father-and-son businessmen Joe and Sam Parker.  After merging with WNBS and the FM station now known as WFGS, they sold the stations to Forever Communications.  It marked the first time that ownership of all of Murray's commercial broadcasters lay with an out-of-town company.  WSJP and WNBS swapped formats and schedules in 2000 to take advantage of the better nighttime signal on WNBS.

The call sign for 1130 was changed to WRKY and then to WJGY before becoming WOFC on 2007-01-11.  This was originally a reference to the station's adult contemporary format, designed to be music that could be played in an office without distracting from work.  Although the station reverted to sports talk a year later, the call letters did not change. The station changed its call sign to the current WBZB on November 23, 2016.

The call letters of WSJP coincided with the initials of co-founder Sammy Joe Parker, although the station's official claim was that it stood for their motto "We Serve the Jackson Purchase".

On March 24, 2017 WBZB changed their format from sports to contemporary hit radio, branded as "The Busy Bee". (info taken from stationintel.com)

Previous logo

References

External links
Froggyland Sports
Froggyland Sports Twitter

BZB
Radio stations established in 1976
1976 establishments in Kentucky
BZB
Contemporary hit radio stations in the United States
Murray, Kentucky